Bergaris is a genus of moths in the family Cossidae.  The species are Southeast Asian, ranging from Myanmar and Vietnam to Sulawesi.

Species
 Bergaris flora Yakovlev, 2006
 Bergaris halim Yakovlev, 2011
 Bergaris jacobsoni (Roepke, 1957)
 Bergaris lutescens (Roepke, 1957)
 Bergaris malayica (Roepke, 1957)
 Bergaris ruficeps (de Joannis, 1929)
 Bergaris solovievi Yakovlev, 2011

References

 , 2006, New Cossidae (Lepidoptera) from Asia, Africa and Macronesia, Tinea 19 (3): 188-213.
 , 2009: The Carpenter Moths (Lepidoptera:Cossidae) of Vietnam. Entomofauna Supplement 16: 11-32.

External links
Natural History Museum Lepidoptera generic names catalog

Zeuzerinae
Cossidae genera